Antoniotto di Montaldo (1368 - 25 July 1398) was the doge of Genoa on two occasions between 1392 and 1394.

Born in Ceranesi, the son of Leonardo Montaldo, who had also been doge, he was elected as doge on 16 June 1392 after his predecessor Antoniotto Adorno had resigned. However, for unknown reasons, he resigned on 15 July 1393 in favor of Pietro Campofregoso. This occurred during a period of political chaos in the Genoese Republic, and after just one day, on 16 July, Campofregoso resigned, to be replaced by Clemente Promontorio; the latter, however, was deposed after a few hours by Francesco Guistiniano di Garibaldo, who reigned until 30 July.

On that date Antoniotto di Montaldo, after a struggle with Antoniotto Adorno, recovered the dogal title, which he kept until 24 May 1394. After losing power, he took refuge in Savona. He died in 1398, perhaps in Genoa, and was buried in the church of San Bartolomeo degli Armeni.

1368 births
1398 deaths
14th-century Doges of Genoa